Kapu Rajaiah (7 April 1925 – 20 August 2012) was an Indian painter. He was well known for his depiction of country life paintings, and his works were displayed around the world. He was the founder of Lalita Kala Samithi in 1963, whose extension was inaugurated at Kala Bhavan.

Life
Rajaiah was born in Siddipet, Medak, into a poor family. He completed a diploma at the Government School of Art in Hyderabad.

His works of Nakashi art had themes such as Vaddera mahila, Yellamma Jogi, Gopika Krishna, Panta Polaalu, Vasantha Keli, Kolatam, Toddy Tappers, Bonalu, and Bathukamma.

Rajaiah died at the age of 87 on 20 August 2012 from complications of Parkinson's disease.(Telugu)

He has eight children which includes but is not limited to Dr. Ramesh Kapu, Raghu Kapu, Krishna Kapu, and Mahesh Kapu.
He has 19 grandchildren which includes but is not limited to Dr. Sri Laxmi Kapu, Sayeesh Kapu, Chitralekha Kapu, Siddarth Kapu, Shravya Kapu, Sai Preetham Kapu, Vishvathma Kapu, and Visrutatma Kapu.

Please visit Dr. Kapu Rajaiah's website for more details.

Awards
 Chitrakalaa Prapoorna in 1975
 Senior Fellowship of Government of India in 1988
 Lalit Kala Akademi
 Kala Praveena in 1993 by JNTU
 Kala Ratna by Bharatamuni Arts Academy, Madanapalli in 1993
 Kala Vibhushana by AIFACS
 Hamsa Award from Government of A.P
 Rajeev  Prathibha Puraskar from Government of A.P
 Lalit Kala Ratna in 2007 Lalit Kala Academy.Govt of India.NEW DELHI

References

Indian male painters
Recipients of the Kala Ratna
People from Medak
1925 births
2012 deaths
Neurological disease deaths in India
Deaths from Parkinson's disease
20th-century Indian painters
Painters from Andhra Pradesh
20th-century Indian male artists